Anyang-dong (안양동, 安養洞) is a neighborhood of Manan district in the city of Anyang, Gyeonggi Province, South Korea. It is officially divided into Anyang-1-dong, Anyang-2-dong, Anyang-3-dong, Anyang-4-dong, Anyang-5-dong, Anyang-6-dong, Anyang-7-dong, Anyang-8-dong and Anyang-9-dong.

External links 
 Anyang-1-dong 
 Anyang-2-dong 
 Anyang-3-dong 
 Anyang-4-dong 
 Anyang-5-dong 
 Anyang-6-dong 
 Anyang-7-dong 
 Anyang-8-dong 
 Anyang-9-dong 

Manan-gu
Neighbourhoods in Anyang, Gyeonggi